Acmanthera is a genus in the Malpighiaceae, a family of about 75 genera of flowering plants in the order Malpighiales. Acmanthera comprises 7 species of trees, shrubs, or subshrubs native to Brazil.

References

Anderson, W. R. 1975. The taxonomy of Acmanthera (Malpighiaceae). Contributions from the University of Michigan Herbarium 11: 41–50.
Anderson, W. R. 1981 ["1980"]. A new species of Acmanthera (Malpighiaceae). Systematic Botany 5: 438–441.

External links
Malpighiaceae Malpighiaceae - description, taxonomy, phylogeny, and nomenclature
Acmanthera

Malpighiaceae
Malpighiaceae genera